The Atlas Festival is an annual music and arts festival held at the Expocenter of Ukraine in Kyiv, Ukraine.

It was founded as Atlas Weekend by Dmytro Sydorenko and is organized by PMK Event Agency and concert hall Atlas. In 2022, the festival was rebranded under its current name.

The event features many genres of music, including rock, indie, hip hop, and electronic dance music.

History

2015 
First Atlas Weekend was held at Art-factory Platforma. Total of 30 artists played at the festival and the event itself gathered more than 20,000 people.

Lineup: BoomBox, The Hardkiss, ONUKA, Jamala, Bahroma, O.Torvald, SunSay, The Maneken and other.

2016 
In 2016 it was the first time Atlas Weekend was held at Expocenter of Ukraine. It gathered 130 artists on 6 stages.

Lineup: The Subways, Kwabs, Apocalyptica, Mashina Vremeni, GusGus, Splean, Jamala, BoomBox, 5'nizza, Monatik, ONUKA, Noize MC, Druha Rika, SunSay and other.

2017 
2017 dates were June 28 - July 2.

Headliners: The Prodigy, Kasabian, John Newman, Three Days Grace, Röyksopp, Monatik, Verka Serduchka, Rudimental, Yellow Claw.

Other artists: Nothing but Thieves, The Hardkiss, BoomBox, Noize MC, O.Torvald, Royal Canoe, Therr Maitz, Dakh Daughters, ONUKA, Vivienne Mort, DETACH, Bondage Fairies, Stoned Jesus and other.

There were more than 250 artists in total on 8 stages during 5 days. More than 350,000 people visited the 2017 edition.

2018 
2018 dates were July 3 - July 8.

Headliners: The Chemical Brothers, Placebo (band), Martin Garrix, LP (singer), Nothing But Thieves, Lost Frequencies, Tom Odell

The 2018 Atlas Weekend saw over 527,000 people attend.

2019 
2019 dates were July 9- July 14.

Headliners: Liam Gallagher, The Black Eyed Peas , ASAP Rocky (was changed to ASAP Ferg)

The 2019 Atlas Weekend saw over 538,000 people attend.

References

External links 

 Atlas Festival official website
 Atlas Festival channel on YouTube

Music festivals in Ukraine
Festivals established in 2015
Annual events in Ukraine
Summer events in Ukraine